Aurora GO Station is a railway station and bus station in the GO Transit network located on Wellington Street East between Yonge Street and Bayview Avenue in Aurora, Ontario, Canada. It is a stop on the Barrie line train service, and connects with York Region Transit local bus routes, and the GO Express Bus between Newmarket Bus Terminal and Union Station Bus Terminal.

History

Aurora station opened on 16 May 1853, when steam train service began between Toronto and Machell's Corners, as Aurora was then known, on the Ontario, Simcoe and Huron Railway. The first train was led by the Toronto, the first locomotive built in Canada, completed at the James Good foundry Toronto Locomotive Works on  16 April 1853. The train consist included two boxcars carrying freight, one passenger coach car, and one mixed passenger and baggage car. This first voyage is commemorated by a plaque installed in 1953 at Union Station in Toronto, as well as a steam locomotive bell placed first at Centennial Park in May 1963, which has since been relocated to Aurora station. There is also a plaque placed in a small parkette at the station by the Board of Trade and another placed by the Province of Ontario to remember the event.

The train's arrival at the Wellington Street train station was greeted with cheers from nearly all residents of the community, who had assembled at the station, and the event was celebrated with a fireworks display. Connection to the railway led to prosperity for Aurora, with the development of two hotels, a wagon maker, a brewery, and other businesses. In 1855 the line was completed to Collingwood.

In 1900, Grand Trunk Railway constructed the present building to a standard plan design with a porte-cochère and low profile. The building was designated a provincial heritage building in 1971 and a federal heritage railway station in 1990.

The station building was renovated after GO Transit became the exclusive passenger carrier in 1992.

On August 21, 2012, GO Transit opened a new bus loop to accommodate all GO and York Region Transit bus service at the station.

Services
As of January 2018, weekday train service operates approximately every 15–30 minutes in the morning peak period (southbound), every 30 minutes in the afternoon peak period (northbound) and every hour at other times. Outside of peak periods, most trains terminate at Aurora with connecting buses for stations further north.

On weekends and holidays, service operates approximately every hour to and from Union Station, with most trains terminating at Aurora station. Three daily trains in each direction cover the full route from Barrie to Toronto, while the remainder have bus connections at Aurora station for stations further north.

Connecting York Region Transit buses
32 Aurora South
33/33A Wellington
54 Bayview
Mobility On-Request

Future Service
Under the GO Transit Regional Express Rail plan, by a target date of 2024 service will be increased to run every 15 minutes during peak, midday, evenings, and weekends between Aurora and Toronto using electric trains rather than the current diesel trains, and along the full route between Barrie and Toronto every 30 minutes during peak and every 60 minutes off-peak.

See also

 List of designated heritage railway stations of Canada

References

External links

 Town of Aurora Grand Trunk Railway Station
 First Steam Train in Canada West 1853
 CNR Aurora
 Historic Sites and Monuments Board of Canada Railway Station Report RSR-13, CNR, Aurora, Ontario

GO Transit railway stations
Rail transport in Aurora, Ontario
Railway stations in the Regional Municipality of York
Railway stations in Canada opened in 1853
Canadian National Railway stations in Ontario
Designated heritage railway stations in Ontario